Greenbrier East High School is a consolidated school in Fairlea, West Virginia, that serves grades 9 through 12. It is a part of Greenbrier County Schools.  Greenbrier East High School is located on Spartan Lane, just off US 219 near Lewisburg, West Virginia. Although not within easy walking distance of Lewisburg, the school has a Lewisburg mailing address.  The school had 1,048 students enrolled (as of 2021-2022), and over 65 faculty members.

The Spartans won the 2012 girls' basketball state championship under head coach and now-Governor Jim Justice (since 2017), a billionaire businessman who has coached the team since 2003 (and the boys' team from 2011 through 2017). Justice has stated that he intends to continue his coaching duties while serving as Governor of the State of West Virginia.

See also
List of high schools in West Virginia
Education in West Virginia

References

External links
 

Schools in Greenbrier County, West Virginia
Public high schools in West Virginia